The Men's keirin at the 2010 Commonwealth Games in New Delhi, India took place on 6 October 2010 at the Indira Gandhi Arena.

Round 1

Heat 1

Heat 2

Heat 3

Round 1 repechage

Heat 1

Heat 2

Heat 3

Round 2

Heat 1

Heat 2

Finals 

Classification race

Medals race

External links
 Reports

Track cycling at the 2010 Commonwealth Games
Cycling at the Commonwealth Games – Men's keirin